Wilson "William" Amakye (born 25 September 1958) is a Ghanaian middle-distance runner. He competed in the men's 800 metres at the 1984 Summer Olympics.

References

External links

1958 births
Living people
Athletes (track and field) at the 1984 Summer Olympics
Ghanaian male middle-distance runners
Olympic athletes of Ghana
Place of birth missing (living people)